The 1952 Commonwealth Prime Ministers' Economic Conference was an emergency Meeting of the Heads of Government of the British Commonwealth. It was called by the British government of Sir Winston Churchill and  held in the United Kingdom in December 1952 as a follow-up to a Commonwealth Finance Minister's conference held in January 1952. The conference was held in the context of British economic and military decline and the United States' surging role in the world.

The principal topic of the conference was the convertibility and liquidity of Pound sterling into American dollars and British concerns that non-sterling Commonwealth countries were building up sterling balances for the purpose of conversion into American dollars, the future of the Pound sterling area, and the alleviation of Commonwealth trade restrictions and imperial preference, particularly in the light of the surging American economy and the desire of Commonwealth countries such as Australia for American investment in order for economic development to occur against British concerns that American economic dominance threatened Britain's economic position. This discussion was necessary as the Commonwealth, with the exception of Canada, had a common pool of gold and dollar reserves. Little was accomplished in the economic discussion with the final communique being described as an "agreement in platitudes".

British concerns at being excluded from the ANZUS military treaty between Australia, New Zealand and the United States were also a topic and were addressed by a communique issued by the prime ministers supporting Britain's demand for a voice in ANZUS.

In addition, Commonwealth prime ministers, after months of discussion on whether the newly ascended Queen Elizabeth II should have a uniform Royal Styles and Titles throughout the Commonwealth or whether realms should adopt their own styles and titles, it was agreed that each member of the Commonwealth "should use for its own purposes a form of the Royal Style and Titles which suits its own particular circumstances but retains a substantial element which is common to all"  and agreed to pass appropriate legislation in their respective parliaments. The prime ministers also agreed to proclaim the new Queen, Elizabeth II, Head of the Commonwealth in succession of her late father, George VI.

Participants

References 

1952
Diplomatic conferences in the United Kingdom
20th-century diplomatic conferences
1952 in international relations
1952 in London
United Kingdom and the Commonwealth of Nations
1952 conferences
November 1952 events in the United Kingdom
December 1952 events in the United Kingdom
1950s in the City of Westminster
Winston Churchill
Robert Menzies